International College Hong Kong (ICHK) is an international kindergarten, primary and secondary school in Hong Kong based in two campuses in the northeastern New Territories.

ICHK Hong Lok Yuen
ICHK Hong Lok Yuen is a kindergarten and primary school located in the Hong Lok Yuen residential estate. It was established in the early 1980s.  It was previously known as the Hong Lok Yuen International School.

The school is a fully authorised IB Primary Years Programme school. The school has a grass playing field as well as a playground, basketball court, school garden, and extensive open space that allows students to play and enjoy sports. The school is also an accredited Forest School Leadership Centre.

ICHK Secondary
ICHK Secondary is an English-medium, international secondary school situated in the northeastern New Territories of Hong Kong. In 2017, it was recognised as a Cambridge Strategies 800 school.

It is a member of the Council of International Schools and an IB World School. It follows an inquiry-based approach to learning in the lower school while preparing students for the IGCSE in Years 10 and 11 and the IB Diploma in Years 12 and 13.

Location

ICHK secondary's campus lies in Shek Chung Au, a rural area on the north-west corner of Starling Inlet and near Luk Keng in Plover Cove Country Park.

Partner schools

ICHK Secondary was established on 28 October 2009 with the support of its three partner schools ICHK-Hong Lok Yuen, Japanese International School and Kingston International School.  Primary students from the partner schools are offered guaranteed places at ICHK offering a through-train education from kindergarten to Year 13.  Students from other primary schools and from outside Hong Kong are also admitted.

References

External links
 ICHK HLY Official Website
 ICHK HLY Instagram
 This School In Hong Kong Is Planting The City’s First Miyawaki Forest, Green Queen
 Forest of new growth, The Standard
 Hong Kong children help green group create city’s first ‘tiny forest’ to beat the heat, South China Morning Post
 The former colonial policeman-turned-teacher on a mission to revamp Hong Kong education, South China Morning Post
 IB Diploma at International College Hong Kong (ICHK)
 Description and photos of ICHK Secondary
 International College Hong Kong Book Challenge 2019 - Youtube video of interview with teachers
 ICHK on Fantastic TV
 Apple Daily Report and video on ICHK

International Baccalaureate schools in Hong Kong
Secondary schools in Hong Kong
Association of China and Mongolia International Schools